Mikhail Abramovich Trilisser (born Meier Abramovich Trilisser) (1 April 1883, in Astrakhan – 2 February 1940), also known by the pseudonym Moskvin, was a Soviet chief of the Foreign Department of the Cheka and the OGPU. Later, he worked for the NKVD as a covert bureau chief and Comintern leader.

Background
Trilisser was born Meier Abramovich Trilisser on April 1, 1883 in Astrakhan. His father was a shoemaker.

Career

Pre-revolution
In 1901, Trilisser joined the Russian Social Democratic Labour Party in Odessa and was arrested in the same year for revolutionary activities.

During the revolution of 1905, he was a revolutionary propagandist in Kazan, Petrograd and Finland. In July 1907, the police arrested him, investigated him at length and sentenced him in 1909 to eight years of hard labour. In November 1914 during this sentence, the government sent him into permanent exile in Siberia.

Revolution
After the February Revolution of 1917, Trilisser served first as editor of the Irkutsk newspaper Voice of the Social-Democrat and then in the military Irkutsk Committee of the Bolsheviks.

Intelligence
In October 1917, Trilisser worked in Siberia. As the Bolsheviks regained territory in the Far East from the Japanese, Trilisser worked underground in the Russian-Chinese border town of Blagoveshchensk, north of Harbin. After helping form a buffer state, the Far Eastern Republic (FER) or Chita Republic (1920–1922), Trilisser was appointed commissioner of the Amur region.

Cheka
By 1921, Trilisser was working under Felix Dzerzhinsky in the foreign intelligence department of the Soviet secret police or Cheka. In 1922, he became head of the foreign department of the new State Political Directorate (later OGPU).

As such, Trilisser played a significant role in the "Trust operation, among whose achievements were penetration of counter-Soviet and White Russian organizations and  the capture and executions of Boris Savinkov and British super spy Sidney Reilly.

OGPU
In 1926, Trilisser became Vice-Chairman of the OGPU.

In October 1929, he was ousted from the foreign department of the OGPU, and was replaced by Artur Artuzov. Trilisser was dismissed for attacking his boss, Genrikh Yagoda, behind his back at a Party meeting — a breach of protocol.

Trilisser was possibly associated with Georgy Chicherin. In Paris, Chicherin and Trilisser may have organized a Soviet subsidy to Nicholas Roerich's expeditions in Central Asia.

In 1930, Stalin had him transferred to the Workers and Peasants Inspection of the RSFSR as deputy commissar. In 1934–35, he was representative of the Soviet Control Commission in the Far East.

Comintern and NKVD
Replacing Osip Pyatnitsky, on 10 August 1935, Trilisser was appointed a member of the Executive Committee of the Comintern, and became head of its Department of International Relations (OMS), which handled subsidies to foreign communist parties. Trilisser adopted the pseudonym, Mikhail Aleksandrovich Moskvin. When Stalin queried this, his deputy Lazar Kaganovich explained that it was "because his surname is known as that of an NKVD functionary". Trilisser developed ciphers to disguise Communist activities. His tasks as a Comintern member appear to have been those of a policeman rather than a communist agitator, including the recruitment of NKVD agents overseas and the kidnapping or assassination of various Soviet emigres, Comintern members and other 'enemies of the people'. Another of Trilisser's tasks was to recruit Soviet covert couriers to supply funds, training, and political support to various overseas communist movements deemed sympathetic to the Soviet Union. In January 1936, he was tasked with verifying loyalty of all the Comintern staff and emigre communists in the USSR. By August, he had identified 3,000 possible 'saboteurs, spies, provocateur agents, etc." whose names were passed to the NKVD, also described as a purge of the Comintern.

United States
In the United States, Trilisser provided Soviet visas for couriers sent to supply funds to a number of American left-wing trade unions, African-American worker organizations, and communist movements, including the CPUSA.  In January 1938, at the specific request and recommendation of Earl Browder, head of the Communist Party of the United States, Trilisser gave Max Bedacht, an American Communist Party activist and former unsuccessful New York Senate candidate, a Soviet visa and employment as a courier supplying funds to the CPUSA and other communist front organizations. Bedacht soon began traveling between the United States, Europe, and the Soviet Union as a courier, using his official cover as an international delegate for the American Communist Party.

Purge and death
Trilisser evidently came into conflict with the NKVD boss Genrikh Yagoda, which led to his dismissal in 1929, but that meant that he was trusted by Yagoda's successor Nikolai Yezhov and survived the mass arrests of NKVD officers that followed Yagoda's dismissal. He was arrested on 23 November 1938, as Lavrentiy Beria was wresting control of the NKVD from Yezhov. His sudden disappearance shocked the head of Comintern, Georgi Dimitrov, who tried to intervene, but was warned by Yezhov that 'Moskvin' was suspected of having been 'entrapped' into becoming a spy. He was executed on 2 February 1940.

Legacy
In 1956, Trilisser was posthumously rehabilitated during the period of Destalinization.

In 1967, a Soviet adventure TV series Operation Trust (Операция "Трест") was created.

In 1983, his character appears in the final episodes of Reilly, Ace of Spies, portrayed by an English actor Anthony Higgins.

Notes

External sources
 Directing the Purges and supervising the NKVD 
 The trial that was not held by Boris A. Starkov

1883 births
1940 deaths
Cheka officers
People from Astrakhan
People from Astrakhan Governorate
Old Bolsheviks
Jewish socialists
Communist Party of the Soviet Union members
Executive Committee of the Communist International
Cheka
NKVD officers
Recipients of the Order of the Red Banner
Great Purge victims from Russia
Soviet rehabilitations
Prisoners of Shlisselburg fortress